Kalanchoe × houghtonii is a hybrid between K. daigremontiana and K. delagoensis named after Arthur Duvernoix Houghton. It is often confused with K. daigremontiana which has strongly cordate to auriculate or even peltate leaves, while the leaves of K. × houghtonii are narrower and the leaf base is attenuate, cuneate to weakly cordate or auriculate.

Gallery

References 

x houghtonii
x houghtonii
Flora of Madagascar
Hybrid plants